Barbara Wallace may refer to:

 Barbara Wallace (politician) (1918–2011), politician in British Columbia, Canada
 Barbara Brooks Wallace (1922–2018), American children's writer
 Barbara C. Wallace, clinical psychologist
 Barbara Wallace (born 1923), actress from Riverdale